Carl Urquhart is a former politician in the province of New Brunswick, Canada. He was elected to the Legislative Assembly of New Brunswick in the 2006 election as the Progressive Conservative MLA for York. He represented that district until the 2014 election, when he was reelected in the redistributed riding of Carleton-York. Urquhart was re-elected in the 2018 provincial election and served as a Minister under Premier Blaine Higgs. He did not re-offer in the 2020 election.

References

Living people
Members of the Executive Council of New Brunswick
Progressive Conservative Party of New Brunswick MLAs
21st-century Canadian politicians
Year of birth missing (living people)